Cibyra yungas is a species of moth of the family Hepialidae. It is known from Bolivia.

References

External links
Hepialidae genera

Hepialidae
Moths of South America
Fauna of the Andes
Yungas
Moths described in 1961